Vitaly Ridlevich (born 12 April 1991) is a former Belarusian footballer.

External links
 
 Profile at teams.by
 

1991 births
Living people
Belarusian footballers
FC Naftan Novopolotsk players
FC Polotsk players
FC Slonim-2017 players
FC Zhlobin players
FC Energetik-BGU Minsk players
Association football goalkeepers